Fayette City Park Swimming Pool, also known as the Fayette WPA Pool and WWI Memorial, is a historic swimming pool located at Fayette, Howard County, Missouri.  It was built in 1936 as a Works Progress Administration funded project.  The pool building is a roughly egg shaped, one-story Art Deco structure with a rectangular two-story entrance hall on the north. The building has two-toned brick walls and a concrete foundation.

It was listed on the National Register of Historic Places in 1999.

The Fayette City Park Swimming Pool is one of several above-ground swimming pools designed by architect Wesley Bintz between 1919 and the 1950s. Headquartered in Lansing, Michigan, Bintz patented his iconic "Bintz Pool," which boasted efficiency and cost-effectiveness through the use of the "ovoid" shape and the above-ground design. While there were once about 135 "Bintz" swimming pools throughout the United States, today there are approximately 16 still standing, with even fewer still operating as swimming pools.

References

Works Progress Administration in Missouri
Buildings and structures on the National Register of Historic Places in Missouri
Art Deco architecture in Missouri
Buildings and structures completed in 1936
Buildings and structures in Howard County, Missouri
National Register of Historic Places in Howard County, Missouri